Nattakrit Thongnoppakun (born December 15, 1991) is a Thai professional footballer who plays as a left-back for the Thai League 2 club Udon Thani.

References

External links

1991 births
Living people
Nattakrit Thongnoppakun
Association football defenders
Nattakrit Thongnoppakun
Nattakrit Thongnoppakun
Nattakrit Thongnoppakun